The 1989–90 UTEP Miners men's basketball team represented the University of Texas at El Paso in the 1989–90 college basketball season. The team was led by head coach Don Haskins. The Miners finished 21–11 (10–6 in WAC), won the WAC tournament championship, and gained an automatic bid to the NCAA tournament.

Roster

Schedule and results

|-
!colspan=9 style=| Regular season
|-
!colspan=9 style=| WAC tournament

|-
!colspan=9 style=| NCAA tournament

Rankings

NBA draft

References

UTEP Miners men's basketball seasons
Utep
Utep